Project 21900 icebreakers and their derivative designs are a series of Russian diesel-electric icebreakers built in the 2000s. They are also sometimes referred to using the type size series designation LK-16.

The two Project 21900 icebreakers built by Baltic Shipyard, Moskva and Sankt-Peterburg, were the first non-nuclear icebreakers built by a Russian shipyard in over three decades and the first new icebreakers ordered following the dissolution of the Soviet Union. Few years later, three additional icebreakers of a slightly improved design referred to as Project 21900M were ordered from Vyborg Shipyard: two vessels (Vladivostok and Novorossiysk) were built in Russia and the third (Murmansk) was subcontracted to the Finnish shipbuilder Arctech Helsinki Shipyard. One icebreaker of revised Project 21900M2 design was ordered from Pella Sietas in 2019 and another from Vyborg Shipyard in 2021.

Development and construction

Project 21900 

In the early 2000s, Russia's state-owned icebreaker fleet consisted mainly of Soviet-era vessels dating back to the 1970s and 1980s. Whereas the Soviet Union had been steadily building up the world's largest icebreaker fleet, Russia had managed to commission only one nuclear-powered icebreaker during the decade following its dissolution. In addition, the construction of another nuclear-powered icebreaker had been suspended in the mid-1990s due to lack of funds and a number of older diesel-powered icebreakers were written off in the 1990s.

Despite efforts to extend the service life of the deteriorating Soviet-era icebreaker fleet and a number of private Russian companies acquiring their own icebreaking vessels to serve their needs, a fleet renewal plan was direly needed to avoid a situation where older icebreakers would be decommissioned before their replacements were ready. As a result, the federal program Modernization of the transport system of Russia (2002–2010) included recapitalizing the icebreaker fleet with a number of new vessels. Among these were two medium-sized diesel-electric icebreakers for service in the Gulf of Finland and Saint Petersburg area.

In July 2004, the Saint Petersburg-based Baltic Shipyard won an international tender for the construction of two 16-megawatt diesel-electric icebreakers for Rosmorport, a state-owned company established in 2003 to manage Russia's port infrastructure and operate its fleet of diesel-powered icebreakers. The other bidders for the $150 million contract included the Finnish shipbuilders Kvaerner Masa-Yards and Aker Finnyards that had previously built a large number of icebreakers for the Soviet Union. Although Baltic Shipyard had built five Arktika-class nuclear-powered icebreakers in 1975–1992 and had the sixth under construction at the time, these would be the first non-nuclear icebreakers built on a Russian shipyard in over three decades and the first new icebreakers ordered following the dissolution of the Soviet Union. While the state budget did not initially allocate funding for the new icebreakers, the construction was nonetheless set to begin already in 2004 and the lead ship was to be delivered by November 2006. 

The lead ship of Project 21900 icebreakers, Moskva, was delivered on 11 December 2008 and the sister ship, Sankt-Peterburg, on 12 July 2009.

Project 21900M 

Following the challenging winter navigating season of 2010–2011, during which ice conditions in the Baltic Sea became so severe that Russia was forced to call in the nuclear-powered icebreaker Vaygach from Murmansk to escort ships in the eastern Gulf of Finland, the Russian government decided to continue the fleet renewal within the framework of the federal program Development of the Transport System of Russia (2010–2020) with three additional 16-megawatt diesel-electric icebreakers. While the initial agreement was signed between Rosmorport and the state-owned United Shipbuilding Corporation (USC) at the Baltic Shipyard, the construction of the first icebreaker awarded to the non-USC-affiliated Vyborg Shipyard on 2 December 2011. On 23 February 2012, the remaining two vessels were also contracted to Vyborg Shipyard which was simultaneously acquired by USC to solve the shipyard's financial problems. Hull assembly, outfitting and commissioning of one icebreaker was subcontracted to the Finnish shipbuilding company Arctech Helsinki Shipyard which, at the time, was a joint venture between USC and a subsidiary of the South Korean STX Offshore & Shipbuilding.

The new icebreakers, referred to as Project 21900M, represented a further development of the preceding design. The lead ship, Vladivostok, was delivered by Vyborg Shipyard on 23 September 2015. She was followed by the Arctech-built Murmansk on 25 December 2015 and the final vessel of the series, Novorossiysk, on 26 December 2016.

Project 21900M2 

In April 2019, Rosmorport contracted Vympel Design Bureau to develop a new 18-megawatt icebreaker concept based on the previous Project 21900M design. The new icebreaker, named Project 21900M2, would feature selective catalytic reduction (SCR) units and scrubbers to reduce nitrogen oxide (NOx) and sulfur oxide (SOx) emissions, respectively, as well as meet the requirements of the International Code for Ships Operating in Polar Waters (Polar Code). 

In August 2019, Rosmorport opened a RUB 7,549,241,400 (about 100 million euro) tender for the construction of a 18-megawatt icebreaker to ensure year-round operation of the Russian Far East. According to the tender, the new icebreaker would be delivered by 30 September 2024. On 5 September 2019, it was announced that the contract was awarded to the Otradnoye-based Pella Shipyard which was the only bidder. However, construction of the vessel has been subcontracted to Pella Sietas in Hamburg, Germany, for which the 100 million euro order is the biggest single contract in the company history. The keel of the vessel was laid on 29 October 2020. However, due to the financial difficulties of the shipyard, construction had reportedly not progressed since early 2021, and in July 2021 the shipyard filed for insolvency.

On 2 April 2020, Rosmorport opened a second tender for a similar icebreaker to be constructed for the Baltic Sea with delivery by 10 December 2024. However, the Russian newspaper Kommersant speculated that the contract price of RUB 7,309,329,900 might be too low to attract bidders for a vessel with foreign-sourced components due to the volatility of the Russian ruble. The tender was extended by two weeks in late April and finally declared invalid on 12 May after no bids had been submitted for the construction of the new icebreaker. It was then proposed to increase the value of the contract by 10%. On 12 November 2020, Rosmorport opened a revised tender with a higher contract price of RUB 8,033,958,400. However, it too failed to attract any bids and was declared invalid on 7 December 2020. In May 2021, Rosmorport re-opened the tender again with an even higher contract price of about RUB 10.5 billion. Having received no bids by the original deadline of 14 July, Rosmorport extended the tender until 26 July, but again no bids were submitted for the construction of the icebreaker. The tender was re-opened again on 5 August with the previous contract price and closed on 18 August. On 20 August, it was announced that the shipbuilding contract had been awarded to the Samara-based Nefteflot CJSC. As the shipyard is located inland along the Volga river, the actual construction of the 14,300-tonne icebreaker was expected to be subcontracted to either Chinese or Turkish shipyard. However, Nefteflot was later disqualified and the tender was re-opened in October 2021. On 26 October, the shipbuilding contract was awarded to the only bidder, Vyborg Shipyard, which had previously built two icebreakers based on the preceding Project 21900M design. Steel cutting began on 31 August 2022 and the keel was laid on 16 November 2022. In October 2022, the General Director of Vyborg Shipyard, Aleksandr Solovyov, stated that the delivery has been postponed from 2025 to late 2028 and 8 to 10 billion rubles of additional financing is likely required to complete the construction of the icebreaker.

Design

Project 21900 and 21900M 

Fully laden, the  icebreakers draw  of water. The general layout of both designs is somewhat similar with the largest external difference being the helideck: Project 21900 icebreakers have a slightly smaller landing area located behind the superstructure while in Project 21900M and 21900M2 icebreakers the helideck has been moved to the forecastle and increased in size.

Both Project 21900 and 21900M icebreakers have a fully integrated diesel-electric propulsion system with four main diesel generators supplying power for both main propulsion as well as the ship's service loads while underway. In the first two vessels, the main power plant consists of two  9-cylinder Wärtsilä 9L32 and two  12-cylinder Wärtsilä 12V32 medium-speed diesel engines. In the three following vessels, all four main engines are identical 12-cylinder Wärtsilä 12V32E units rated at  each. In addition, all icebreakers have two Wärtsilä 4L20 auxiliary diesel generators for use when the vessel is at port.

For main propulsion, both Project 21900 and 21900M icebreakers are fitted with two electrically driven Steerprop Z-drive azimuth thrusters with four-bladed stainless steel propellers. In the first two vessels, the propellers were in pusher configuration whereas the later icebreakers had more efficient forward-facing propellers. In addition, the icebreakers have a single transverse bow thruster for maneuvering.

While officially the Project 21900M icebreakers have the same ice class, their hulls and propulsion systems are strengthened to meet the requirements of Icebreaker7 which is a higher ice class intended for icebreaking operations in the Arctic.

Project 21900M2 

Due to the international sanctions during the 2022 Russian invasion of Ukraine, almost all imported equipment will be replaced with domestic alternatives. Although the layout of the icebreaker remains largely unchanged, the design needs to be reworked for Russian equipment such as main diesel engines manufactured by Kolomna Locomotive Works.

Ships in class

Notes

References

 
Ships built in Russia